Lobethal  is a town in the Adelaide Hills area of South Australia. It is located in the Adelaide Hills Council local government area, and is nestled on the banks of a creek between the hills and up the sides of the valley. It was once the centre of the Adelaide Hills wool processing industry, which continued until around 1950. The mill buildings are now used by a number of cottage industry and handcraft businesses. At the 2016 census, Lobethal had a population of 2,135.

The town is famed during the Christmas season for its display of Christmas lights and decorations, which have attracted visitors from around the state since the 1950s.

History
Lobethal  was settled in 1842 by Prussian immigrants, who migrated to South Australia with Pastor Gotthard Fritzsche aboard the sailing vessel Skjold, who initially went to Hahndorf but were alerted to good land in the upper Onkaparinga. German Lutheran settlers provided compatriot, Johann Friedrich Krummnow, who had arrived in South Australia three years earlier and was a naturalised English citizen, with funds for land purchases to establish the community. Krummnow wanted it based on his own principles of shared property and fervent prayer. The Lobethal settlers rejected Krummnow's vision and legally disputed his right to the land titles.

"Lobethal" is German for "valley of praise". On the day of the division of the land, according to Reverend I. Ey's account, 'it received the name Lobethal, taken from the II Book of Chronicles, chapter 20, verse 26 (EN) (DE), which, according to Luther's translation, means Lobethal or 'Valley of praise'.

The town, as with many German towns in South Australia, was built in typical Silesian Hufendorf style, with the cottages arranged in a line along the main street, and each family having a long, narrow strip of land (used for growing crops) stretching from the main street back to the village common, where all families could allow their animals to graze. The advantages of this layout were that everyone had access to both fresh water and the main road, and a relatively even distribution of fertile and infertile land. While the town has developed out of recognition (the main street was Mill Road, now the western boundary of the town), elements of the hufendorf layout remain.

In 1845, St John's Lutheran Church was built; it is now the oldest Lutheran church building in Australia. A new church has been built alongside. Many of the settlers' traditions remain to this day, although the town is not as overtly Germanic as Hahndorf or Tanunda.

In 1850, F.W. Kleinschmidt set up a brewery. It closed after about two decades when Kleinschmidt turned his attention to hop-growing – which subsequently became a focus for Lobethal's agriculture. The brewery itself was turned into the Lobethal Tweed Factory, which became the Onkaparinga Woollen Company and operated until 1992. A cricket bat factory utilising locally grown willow also operated from 1894 until 1950.

Due to the Great War in Europe, in 1917 the South Australian state government changed many German place names. The name Lobethal was changed to Tweedvale (honouring the town's major industry). Lobethal was re-instated as the town's name with the enactment of the South Australia Nomenclature Act of 1935 on 12 December 1935.

Geography
Lobethal is located between Gumeracha and Woodside along the north–south road, and east of Adelaide via Magill and Norton Summit.

Climate

Lobethal has a Warm-Summer Mediterranean climate abbreviated Csb on the Köppen-Scale.

Facilities
Lobethal contains two hotels, two primary schools and a Country Fire Service station.

The Lutheran Church complex, and the Archives and Historical Museum, contain information about the lives of the towns German settlers, and are open to the public year-round.

Lobethal Bierhaus is a brewery located on the Main Street of the town. It makes both English and German style beers.

The Lobethal Bakery provides a selection of German style breads and cakes.

There are many artisan producers based in the old woollen mill facility.

Lobethal, and the surrounding area, contains many Wineries and a growing number of cellar doors.

Culture
The town is famous around Adelaide for its display of Christmas lights along its main streets in December each year; many residents also adorn their front gardens and verandahs with elaborate displays. The tradition began in the 1950s and is the largest Christmas display in South Australia. In 2019, however, the events were cancelled after a big bush fires caused a lot of damage.

The area is fast becoming known for its many producers of food and beverages.

Transport
The area is serviced by Adelaide Metro. Buses run from Lobethal to the Adelaide CBD via the South Eastern Freeway and Onkaparinga Valley Road. There are also buses from Lobethal to Verdun Junction and Mount Barker.

Motorsport

Lobethal was the host town for the 1939 Australian Grand Prix, Australia's premier motor race of that year. The race, which was won by Alan Tomlinson driving an MG TA, was staged on the Lobethal Circuit which comprised public roads in and around the town. The circuit was used for four race meetings from 1937 through to 1948.

References

External links

 The Lights of Lobethal – Web site of the (Christmas) Lights of Lobethal Committee
 Tourist Information on Lobethal

Towns in South Australia